"I Go On" is the second and final single from MC Lyte's fourth album Ain't No Other. Produced by Tyrone Fyffe, Franklin Grant and Wreckx-n-Effect's Markell Riley, it was released on November 4, 1993.

As in her previous single, the lyrics focus on talking about her sexuality although now as part of a smooth production.

"I Go On" peaked at  68 on the Billboard's Hot R&B Singles in January 1994. It did not chart on the Billboard Hot 100, but peaked at  16 on the Bubbling Under Hot 100 extension chart. This would be the last work of Lyte published under First Priority Music, since it would later sign with East West Records.

Content
The song has a softer production than the hardcore sound that predominates on the album. In it, Lyte talks about casually having sex with men whom she later "refuse to call 'em back", in addition to responding to those who are upset about it "It ain't worth it for the moment or the minute/You was in it then you want it but, no, now ya done, kid." In the third verse it seeks to convey a message anti-violence against women "I only here for the righten night/To be hit not smack not slapped or kicked/So if you coming my way you gotta be strong/Strong enough to know that hitting a women is wrong."

In a review from May 2017, the website dedicated to hip hop music The Boombox considered I Go On as "the best examples of Lyte flipping the gender script."

Samples 
The song contains a riff sample from "Been So Long" by Anita Baker and the hook is based on interpolations from "La Di Da Di" by Doug E. Fresh and Slick Rick, in which Lyte says "I go on and on and on and on/Let it flow, ya don't stop" in reference to the lines "And on and on and on" and "To the tick tock ya don't stop". Also included in the single version of the song is a remix by Walter "Mucho" Scott titled "I Go on (Gangsta Mix)", which in turn samples the riff of "Young, Gifted and Black" by Aretha Franklin.

Single track listing

12" Vinyl

A-Side
 "I Go On" (LP Version) (4:47)
 "I Go On" (Midnight Mix) (4:05)
Produced by Chris Smith
 "I Go On" (Midnightstrumental) (7:20)
Produced by Chris Smith

B-Side
 "I Go On" (Gangsta Mix) (5:15)
Produced by Walter "Mucho" Scott
 "I Go On" (Accapella) (4:53)
 "Ruffneck" (Beatnut Remix) (3:26)
Remixed by The Beatnuts

Cassette

A-Side
 "I Go On" (LP Version) (4:47)
 "I Go On" (Midnight Mix) (4:05)
Produced by Chris Smith and Teddy Riley

B-Side
 "I Go On" (LP Version) (4:47)
 "I Go On" (Midnight Mix) (4:05)
Produced by Chris Smith and Teddy Riley

Cassette Maxi-Single

A-Side
 "I Go On" (LP Version) (4:47)
 "I Go On" (Midnight Mix) (4:05)
Produced by Chris Smith
 "I Go On" (Midnightstrumental) (7:20)
Produced by Chris Smith

B-Side
 "I Go On" (Gangsta Mix) (5:15)
Produced by Walter "Mucho" Scott
 "I Go On" (Accapella) (4:53)
 "Ruffneck" (Beatnut Remix) (3:26)
Remixed by The Beatnuts

Personnel
Credits are taken from the liner notes.
Lyrics By – Lyte
Producer, Engineer, Music By – Franklyn Grant
Producer, Music By – Markell Riley, Tyrone Fyffe
Engineer [Additional] – George Mayers, John Haynes
Mastered By – Amelia Moore, Jose Rodriguez
Executive Producer – Nat Robinson

Charts

References

MC Lyte songs
Atlantic Records singles
1993 songs
1993 singles
Songs written by MC Lyte